Kostenko is a Ukrainian surname. It is a surname of patronymic derivation, based on the name of Kost (Кость), Kostyantyn (Костянтин) or 'Constantine (name)' and literally meaning "child of Kost". 

It may refer to:

Aleksei Kostenko (born 1984), Russian footballer
Andrzej Kostenko (born 1936), Polish filmmaker
Ekaterina Kostenko (born 1984), Ukrainian pair skater
Elena Kostenko (1926–2019), Soviet Russian painter
Fyodor Kostenko (1896–1942), Soviet WWII army commander
Ihor Kostenko (1991–2014), Ukrainian journalist and student
Konstantin Kostenko (1939–2004), Soviet sprint canoeist
Kyrylo Kostenko (born 1998), Ukrainian footballer
Lina Kostenko (born 1930), Ukrainian poet and writer
Natalya Kostenko (born 1980), Russian politician
Olga Kostenko (born 1984), Russian sprint canoeist
Vladimir Kostenko (1903–1967), Ukrainian-American ballet dancer
Yan Kostenko (born 2003), Ukrainian footballer
Yurii V. Kostenko (born 1945), Ukrainian diplomat
Yuriy Kostenko (born 1951), Ukrainian politician

See also
 
 Kostenik
 Kostenki

Patronymic surnames
Ukrainian-language surnames
Surnames of Ukrainian origin